Joseph Patrick Duffy (December 6, 1906 – October 14, 1965) was an American football player.

A native of Dayton, Ohio, he attended Stivers High School played college football for the Dayton.

He also played professional football in the National Football League (NFL) as a back for the Dayton Triangles. He appeared in five NFL games during the 1929 season.

After football, he received a law degree from the University of Dayton in 1930. He became an assistant Dayton city attorney in 1937 and city prosecutor in 1942. During World War II, he served in the U.S. Navy Seabees for 27 months, participating in the Battle of Munda Point, the New Georgia campaign, and the Battle of Peleliu. After the war, he returned to his law practice with the city. He died of a heart attack in 1965 at age 58.

References

1906 births
1965 deaths
Dayton Flyers football players
Dayton Triangles players
Players of American football from Ohio
People from Dayton, Ohio